The Open de France Dames is a women's professional golf tournament in France on the Ladies European Tour. It has been played annually since 1987, with four exceptions: 1990, 1991, 1992, and 1998.

Since the 2011 edition, Lacoste has been the title sponsor of the event. Between 2012 and 2017 the tournament was held at Golf de Chantaco, near Saint-Jean-de-Luz in the Basque Country, which belongs to the Lacoste family. As Chantaco underwent construction works after the 2017 event, the tournament was moved to the Golf du Médoc Resort.

Winners

References

External links

Ladies European Tour

French Open
Golf tournaments in France
Recurring sporting events established in 1987